Leamon Green (born 1959) is an American visual artist who works in different types of media.

Biography
Green was born in 1959 in the town of Anniston, Alabama. His education includes a Master of Fine Arts at Temple University, Philadelphia (1985), a Bachelor of Fine Arts from the Cleveland Institute of Art, Ohio (1982) and a Studio Arts Degree from Concord College (1977–79). In 2007, he was awarded the Fulbright award to travel to Tanzania, where he lived and taught for a year.

He is currently an associate professor of the fine arts department at Texas Southern University in Houston. His wife is Susan Wallace, who taught Art History to 2015 Art History Bowl Texas State Champions Patrick Smith (Captain), Imran Hyder (Second Chair), Aditya Deshpande (Third Chair), and Leo Gao (Substitute).

Green's work is held in the collection of The Museum of Fine Arts, Houston.

Solo exhibitions
Leamon Green: Recent Work, Beeville Art Museum, virtual exhibition, 2020
Is the Way Closed, Hooks-Epstein Galleries, Houston, Texas, 2017
Look At Them, O'Kane Gallery, University of Houston Downtown, Houston, Texas, 2016
Ancestral Legacies, Houston Baptist University, Houston, Texas, 2016
Leamon Green, Hooks-Epstein Galleries, Houston, Texas, 2015
What She Said, Hooks-Epstein Galleries, Houston, Texas, 2011
Tug, Hooks-Epstein Galleries, Houston, Texas, 2009
Made in Tanzania, New Artwork, Alliance Francaise, Dar es Salaam, Tanzania, 2008
Embrace, Hooks-Epstein Galleries, Houston, Texas, 2005
Lock + Key, Hooks-Epstein Galleries, Houston, Texas, 2004
Ancestral Images, Galveston Arts Center, Galveston, Texas, 2003
Portraits or Objects, Thomas & Hall Fine Art, Dallas, Texas, 2003
Leamon Green, College of the Mainland, Texas City, Texas, 2002
Step into the Footsteps of Your Ancestors, University Museum, Texas Southern University, Houston, Texas, 2001
Leamon Green, Kathleen Coleman Gallery, Houston, Texas, 2000
Leamon Green: Works on Paper, Richland College, Dallas, Texas, 1999
Lay it On, MD Modern, Houston, Texas, 1999
Hear What They Do Not Say, African American Museum, Dallas, Texas, 1998
Patterns, Visual Arts Gallery, Memorial Student Center, Texas A&M University, College Station, Texas, 1997
This Time Around, Barnes Blackman Gallery, Houston, Texas, 1996

Selected group exhibitions
Miniatures, Hooks-Epstein Galleries, Houston, 2003
Circle of Friends, Artscan Gallery, Houston, 2002

References

External links
Official site

1959 births
Living people
African-American artists
American artists
Temple University alumni
Cleveland Institute of Art alumni
21st-century African-American people
20th-century African-American people